JBK or Jansen Barbieri Karn, is the name by which former Japan and Rain Tree Crow band members Steve Jansen, Richard Barbieri and Mick Karn have recorded several albums of music, all released by their own Medium Productions label, between 1993 and 2001.

After the band project Rain Tree Crow was disbanded in 1991, the remaining three members decided to create a recording label so they could continue to creatively collaborate as well with other artists, without any pressure from record companies. Also without a principal songwriter, like David Sylvian, they had the freedom to express their ideas and experiment. The band's music style was an experimental, ambient, progressive art rock with influence of electronic music. In their studio and live recordings the JBK also collaborated with Porcupine Tree frontman Steven Wilson, guitarists Rob Dean, Aziz Ibrahim, David Torn, Sugizo, Masami Tsuchiya, saxophonist Theo Travis, and vocalists Zoe Niblett, Robby Aceto among others.

Discography
 Studio album
1993 – Beginning to Melt (Medium Productions)
1999 – _Ism (Medium)

 EPs
1994 – Seed (Medium)
2016 – Breakable Moons (Session Outtakes)

Live album
2001 – Playing in a Room with People (Medium)

 Compilation album
 1999 – Medium Label Sampler (Medium)

References

External links
JBK's Bandcamp

Art rock musical groups
British experimental rock groups
British electronic music groups
British ambient music groups